Ballyogan is a residential area in Dún Laoghaire–Rathdown, Ireland, located approximately 12 km south of Dublin city centre.

Location
Ballyogan is bounded to the west and north by Stepaside and Sandyford; across the M50 motorway to the east is Leopardstown and to the south, Carrickmines.

Ballyogan is centred on Ballyogan Road. The residential and shopping areas are located between the road and the M50 motorway which runs more or less parallel to and east of Ballyogan road. The Ballyogan Road is nearly 3 km long; it starts in Sandyford at its northern end and ends at Carrickmines.

Population
The area has a population of about 2,000 people.

Amenities
West of the Ballyogan Road is a former Local Authority landfill and a recycling centre.

Historical elements
Also running west of the road are remnants of the Pale ditch, a defensive structure which marks a former border of The Pale. Just west of here are the Dublin Mountains which were outside English control. Another reminder of the area's past as a frontier country is found at adjoining Carrickmines where the remains of Carrickmines Castle became a centre of controversy when the M50 was being built.

Transport
The Luas Green Line extension, opened in October 2010, runs most of the length of the road on its Eastern side. It has three stops on Ballyogan Road; The Gallops; Leopardstown Valley and Ballyogan Wood, which is in Ballyogan, as the name suggests.

See also
 List of towns and villages in Ireland

References 

Places in Dún Laoghaire–Rathdown